Cevizköy is a village in Pınarhisar district of Kırklareli Province, Turkey,  It is situated in the eastern Thrace (Trakya) plains. The population of the village is 894 as of 2011. The old name of this village is Çongara. It was a Bulgarian village during the Ottoman Empire era. But after the Second Balkan War the Bulgarian population was forced to leave the settlement.

References

Villages in Pınarhisar District